Masaba or Masab may refer to:
the Masaba people
the Masaba language
Masab, a peak of Mount Elgon, east Africa

Language and nationality disambiguation pages